Evelyn Philip Shirley (22 January 1812 – 19 September 1882), was a British politician, antiquary and genealogist.

Background

Shirley was born in London, the eldest son of Evelyn Shirley and Eliza, daughter of Arthur Stanhope. He was a descendant of Robert Shirley, 1st Earl Ferrers. He was educated first privately and from 1826 at Eton College, before matriculating in 1830 from Magdalen College, Oxford, graduating BA in 1834 and MA in 1837.

He inherited Ettington Park at Alderminster, near Stratford-on-Avon on the death of his father in 1856 and commissioned architect John Prichard to remodel it in 1858. It is now a Grade I listed building.

Career
Shirley sat as Member of Parliament for County Monaghan from 1841 to 1847 and for Warwickshire South from 1853 to 1865. He served as High Sheriff of Monaghan for 1837 and as High Sheriff of Warwickshire for 1867.

Personal
Shirley married Mary Clara Elizabeth, daughter of Sir Edmund Lechmere, 2nd Baronet, in 1842. They had one son, Sewallis Shirley, and three daughters. Shirley died in September 1882, aged 70. His wife died in August 1894.

See also
Earl Ferrers

References

External links 
 
 

1812 births
1882 deaths
Members of the Parliament of the United Kingdom for County Monaghan constituencies (1801–1922)
UK MPs 1841–1847
Members of the Parliament of the United Kingdom for English constituencies
UK MPs 1852–1857
UK MPs 1857–1859
UK MPs 1859–1865
High Sheriffs of Monaghan
High Sheriffs of Warwickshire
People educated at Eton College
Alumni of Magdalen College, Oxford
Sheriffs of Warwickshire